Donald Allen Curtis (22 October 1904 – 18 October 1983) was an English professional golfer.

In 1926 he lost in a playoff for the Findlater Shield, the assistants' championship. He had tied with Walter Thomas but lost the 18-hole playoff after a disappointing 82.

Curtis's first big success was when he won the 1936 News Chronicle Tournament. Curtis reached the semi-final of the 1937 News of the World Match Play where he lost to Percy Alliss by 1 hole. The following year he won the Dunlop-Southport Tournament at Southport and Ainsdale Golf Club, beating Arthur Lees by 2 strokes and taking the £315 first prize. Later in 1938, he was one of the runners-up in the News Chronicle Tournament behind Reg Whitcombe.

Tournament wins
1936 News Chronicle Tournament
1938 Dunlop-Southport Tournament

Results in major championships

Note: Curtis only played in The Open Championship.

CUT = missed the half-way cut
"T" indicates a tie for a place

Team appearances
Seniors vs Juniors (representing the Juniors): 1928
England–Scotland Professional Match (representing England): 1934 (winners), 1938 (winners)
Llandudno International Golf Trophy (representing England): 1938 (winners)
Great Britain–Argentina Professional Match (representing Great Britain): 1939 (winners)

References

English male golfers
Sportspeople from Poole
1904 births
1983 deaths